Alpha Octantis is a binary star system in the constellation of Octans. The name is Latinized from α Octantis. Despite being labeled the "alpha" star by Lacaille, it is not the brightest star in the constellation—that title belongs to Nu Octantis. It is visible to the naked eye as a faint, yellow-white-hued point of light with an overall apparent visual magnitude of approximately 5.13. The system is located approximately 148 light-years away from the Sun based on parallax.

This is a double-lined spectroscopic binary star which consists of two similar giant stars, each with spectral type F, orbiting each other with a period of just over 9 days and an eccentricity of 0.39. The pair form a Beta Lyrae-type eclipsing binary system, dropping by magnitude 0.04 during the primary eclipse.

References

External links
 Alpha Octantis, Jim Kaler, Stars.

F-type giants
Spectroscopic binaries
Circumstellar disks
Beta Lyrae variables

Octans
Octantis, Alpha
CD-77 01053
199532
104043
8021